In chemistry, plumbite is the  oxyanion or hydrated forms, or any salt containing this anion. In these salts, lead is in the oxidation state +2. It is the traditional term for the IUPAC name plumbate(II).

For example, lead(II) oxide (PbO) dissolves in alkali to form salts containing the  anion:
PbO +  → 

Lead(II) hydroxide also dissolves in excess alkali to form the  anion:
 + 4  → 

The plumbite ion is a weak reducing agent. When it functions as one, it is oxidized to the plumbate ion.

See also
Plumbate
Lead
Lead(II) oxide

References

Lead(II) compounds
Oxyanions